Killeen is a townland in the civil parish of Borrisokane, in the Barony of Ormond Lower, County Tipperary, Ireland.

It is one of eight townlands in County Tipperary sharing the name Killeen.

References

Townlands of County Tipperary